AM-1220 is a drug that acts as a potent and moderately selective agonist for the cannabinoid receptor CB1, with around 19 times selectivity for CB1 over the related CB2 receptor. It was originally invented in the early 1990s by a team led by Thomas D'Ambra at Sterling Winthrop, but has subsequently been researched by many others, most notably the team led by Alexandros Makriyannis at the University of Connecticut. The (piperidin-2-yl)methyl side chain of AM-1220 contains a stereocenter, so there are two enantiomers with quite different potency, the (R)-enantiomer having a Ki of 0.27 nM at CB1 while the (S)-enantiomer has a much weaker Ki of 217 nM.

Related compounds
A number of related compounds are known with similar potent cannabinoid activity, with modifications such as substitution of the indole ring at the 2- or 6-positions, the naphthoyl ring substituted at the 4-position or replaced by substituted benzoyl rings or other groups, or the 1-(N-methylpiperidin-2-ylmethyl) group replaced by similar heterocyclic groups such as N-methylpyrrolidin-2-ylmethyl or N-methylmorpholin-3-ylmethyl. AM-1220 was first detected as an ingredient of synthetic cannabis smoking blends in 2010.

Legal status

United States 
in the United States of America all CB1 receptor agonists of the 3-(1-naphthoyl)indole class such as AM-1220 are Schedule I Controlled Substances under the Controlled Substances Act s.

United Kingdom 
it's illegal to supply, smuggle,  distribute, transport, sell or trade the pharmaceutical drug under the Psychoactive Substances Act 2016 which was enforced on May26th 2016.

China

As of October 2015, AM-1220 is a controlled substance in China.

See also 
 A-834,735
 AM-1221
 AM-1248
 AM-2201
 AM-2233
 Cannabipiperidiethanone

References 

Naphthoylindoles
AM cannabinoids
Aminoalkylindoles
Piperidines
Designer drugs
CB1 receptor agonists
CB2 receptor agonists